WBWB (96.7 FM, "B97") is a Mainstream Top 40 radio station serving the Bloomington, Indiana area. The station is owned and operated by Sound Management, LLC.

References

External links
B97 official website

BWB
Contemporary hit radio stations in the United States